Songs from Heathcliff is a studio album by English singer Cliff Richard, released in October 1995. It features ten songs from Richard's self-conceived musical Heathcliff, in which Richard played the title character. The musical is based on the Emily Brontë novel Wuthering Heights. The music was composed by John Farrar with lyrics written by Tim Rice. Olivia Newton-John is a guest on the album, featuring in five duets with Richard. The style of the music ranges from pop/rock to mock-period music, featuring instruments such as the harpsichord and violin.

Singles
Four singles were released from the album. The lead single, "A Misunderstood Man", peaked on debut at number 19 in the UK Singles Chart, but suffered from a lack of airplay on radio (including from BBC Radio 2) and television. The second single, "Had to Be", a duet with Olivia Newton-John, reached number 22. The third single, "The Wedding", a duet with Helen Hobson, reached number 40. "The Wedding" is a retitle of the album track "I Do Not Love You Isabella (Heathcliff's Wedding Song)" which features Richard in duet with Olivia Newton-John and Kristina Nichols. The fourth single, "Be with Me Always" was not released until January 1997 and it only reached number 52.

Track listing
All songs written by John Farrar and Tim Rice.
"A Misunderstood Man"
"Sleep of the Good"
"Gypsy Bundle"
"Had to Be" 
"When You Thought of Me"
"Dream Tomorrow" 
"I Do Not Love You Isabella (Heathcliff's Wedding Song)" 
"Choosing When It's Too Late" 
"Marked with Death" 
"Be with Me Always"

Charts and certifications

Weekly charts

Certifications

References

External links
Songs from Heathcliff at Discogs

1995 albums
Cliff Richard albums
Albums produced by John Farrar
EMI Records albums
Works based on Wuthering Heights
Music based on novels